The SkyTrail Bridge spans the South Saskatchewan River in Outlook, Saskatchewan, Canada. It was originally built by the Canadian Pacific Railway over the full width of the river's flood channel and has eight spans. It served as a railway bridge from October 23, 1912, until March 16, 1987.  In 2003 it was converted to a pedestrian bridge and is now the longest pedestrian bridge in Canada.  The bridge is part of the Trans-Canada Trail.  Due to structural issues, the bridge has been closed since late 2013.

Origins

The SkyTrail Bridge dates back as far as 1887, when it officially opened as the Saint-Laurent Railway Bridge in Montreal, Quebec. The bridge was deconstructed in 1911 to make way for a new, double track bridge parallel to the old single track bridge. The sections of the bridge were then transported to Outlook and used in the construction of the new Outlook Railway Bridge, which officially opened on October 23, 1912.

Bridge Design

The SkyTrail features a fascinating bridge design known as a Whipple Truss - and the SkyTrail features the longest known Whipple trusses in Canada and North America. On their own, Whipple trusses are very difficult to find in Canada, but the SkyTrail features a rare Whipple deck truss instead of the slightly more common Whipple through truss, giving the bridge even more rarity.

See also 
List of crossings of the South Saskatchewan River
List of bridges in Canada

References

External links
Skytrail - Canada's Longest Pedestrian Bridge

Bridges completed in 1912
Railway bridges in Saskatchewan
Hiking trails in Saskatchewan
Trans Canada Trail
Bridges over the South Saskatchewan River
Pedestrian bridges in Canada
Former railway bridges in Canada
Rail trail bridges
1912 establishments in Saskatchewan